Tantawanga Parish is a remote civil Parish, of the County of Barrona, a cadasteral division of New South Wales.

Tantawanga is on the Paroo River near Wanaaring, New South Wales.
The topography is the flat and arid with a Köppen climate classification of BSk (Hot semi arid).

References

Localities in New South Wales
Geography of New South Wales
Populated places in New South Wales
Far West (New South Wales)